St. Theodore Guerin High School is a private Roman Catholic college-preparatory high school located in Noblesville, Indiana, a northern Indianapolis suburb. The school's mascot is the Golden Eagle and school colors are purple and gold.  It is part of the Roman Catholic Diocese of Lafayette in Indiana. The enrollment is mostly drawn from local suburban municipalities such as Carmel, Fishers, Noblesville, Westfield, and Zionsville, as well as parts of northern Marion County and Kokomo, Indiana.

History
Founded in 2004, St. Theodore Guerin High School was named after Saint Mother Théodore Guérin. Guerin Catholic was the first privately funded Catholic high school built in the state of Indiana in over thirty years. The first graduating class in 2007 consisted of 25 students, with 100% matriculating into four-year colleges.

Academics
In the fall of 2006, St. Theodore Guerin became the first Catholic high school in Greater Indianapolis to become a candidate to offer the International Baccalaureate Diploma Program.

St. Theodore Guerin has been recognized by The Cardinal Newman Society and the Catholic Education Honor Roll each year since 2008 as one of the United States "Top 50 Catholic High Schools." Guerin Catholic is one of only three Catholic high schools in the state of Indiana to receive this award. Catholic high schools that receive the honor roll designation are marked by excellence in academics and the integration of Catholic identity throughout all aspects of their educational and extracurricular programs. Less than five percent of the Catholic high schools in the United States receive this recognition.

Campus

The school is located on seventy-two acres, one mile north of 146th street, in the heart of Hamilton County.

The St. Joseph Chapel was dedicated in 2004. The chapel contains twelve stained glass windows depicting St. Junípero Serra, St. Elizabeth Seton, St. Martin de Porres, St. Katharine Drexel, Juliette Toussaint, Pierre Toussaint, St. Juan Diego, St. John Neumann, St. Kateri Tekakwitha, St. Frances Xavier Cabrini, St. Isaac Jogues, and  St. Théodore Guérin. Daily Mass, Eucharistic adoration, and the Sacrament of Reconciliation are offered in the chapel for students, faculty, and staff.

In 2011, Guerin Catholic had a growing enrollment and was in need of additional academic classrooms. On November 23, the school's community gathered for the groundbreaking of a new academic wing. The east academic wing was completed in August 2014, adding 24 classrooms to the campus.

 St. Isidore Farm is the school vegetable farm. Students can sign up for regular farming time slots and earn one elective course credit.

In the Spring of 2021, the school announced the Unite+Build+Soar Capital Campaign to build a new Fine Arts and Wellness Center. The 65,000 square foot addition includes a Fine Arts Auditorium with 500 seats, Athletic Fieldhouse with three gymnasiums, as well as additional academic and gathering spaces.

Athletics
The Guerin Catholic Golden Eagles are members of the Circle City Conference, but prior to 2016-2017 they were independent.  The school colors are purple and gold.  The following Indiana High School Athletic Association (IHSAA) sanctioned varsity sports are offered:

Baseball (boys)
Basketball (boys and girls)
Cross country (boys and girls)
Football (boys)
Golf (boys and girls)
Lacrosse (boys and girls)
Soccer (boys and girls)
Softball (girls)
Swimming (boys and girls)
Tennis (boys and girls)
Track (boys and girls)
Volleyball (boys and girls)
Wrestling (boys)

Historic rivalries
A strong rivalry exists between Guerin Catholic and Brebeuf Jesuit Preparatory School.  The two schools are quite similar in that both are Catholic and are co-educational schools on the north side of the Indianapolis metropolitan area.

State championships
The Indiana High School Athletic Association has awarded the school the following state championships:

Boys’ Basketball - 2012, 2015
Boys’ Golf - 2022
Boys’ Lacrosse - 2021
Girls’ Lacrosse - 2022
Boys’ Soccer - 2013, 2014

See also
 List of high schools in Indiana

References

External links
 School website

Educational institutions established in 2004
Catholic secondary schools in Indiana
Private high schools in Indiana
IHSAA Conference-Independent Schools
Schools in Hamilton County, Indiana
2004 establishments in Indiana
Roman Catholic Diocese of Lafayette in Indiana
Circle City Conference schools